De Hardheid is a Dutch skapunk band from Amsterdam composed of nine members. The band was founded in 1996 and sings in Dutch about a variety of subjects.

De Hardheid regularly performs at poppodia and festivals throughout their home country, the Netherlands.

The band was influenced by bands like The Specials, Doe Maar, The Skatalites and the Dead Kennedys.

Discography
Wreed voor je (1999)
Lijfstraf (2001) — Corporal Punishment
De Nodige Hardheid (2003) — The Necessary Hardness
Onze Jongens (2006) Our Boys
Laat Je Tanden Zien (EP) (2008)

Dutch ska groups
Dutch punk rock groups